The Răzoare mine was a large mine in the north of Romania in Maramureș County,  southeast of Baia Mare and  north of the capital, Bucharest. Răzoare represents one of the largest manganese reserve in Romania having estimated reserves of 5 million tonnes of manganese.

The mine opened in 1988 and closed in 2006.

References

Manganese mines in Romania
Târgu Lăpuș